Acetyl cyanide is the organic compound with the formula CH3C(O)CN.  It is an acyl cyanide. Acetyl cyanide is a colorless liquid.

Structure
Its structure was determined through the use of electron diffraction intensities and rotational spectroscopy.

Reactions
Two main types of reactions can occur with acetyl cyanide as a reactant; aldol condensation and enolate substitution. Aldol condensation can occur when acetyl cyanide reacts with (Z)-but-2-enal to form (2E,4E)-hexa-2,4-dienoyl cyanide:

The photochemical and thermal reactions of acetyl cyanide have been extensively studied. For example, formyl cyanide does not undergo unimolecular decomposition to HCN and CO spontaneously. However, acetyl cyanide, also a member of this family,  breaks down through this unimolecular decomposition at 470 °C. This reaction occurs through decarbonylation. This division of the molecule to a ketone and hydrogen cyanide were noted to be under competitive circumstances. This caused a study of the thermal unimolecular reactions that acetyl cyanide undergoes.

The unimolecular decompositions that acetyl cyanide undergo have been confirmed to be less energetically favorable than the molecule undergoing isomerization  to acetyl isocyanide. However, through other photolysis experiments have resulted in the formation of a CN radical through acetyl cyanide decomposing into CH3CO + CN or CH3COCN.

Synthesis
Acetyl cyanide is prepared from acetyl chloride and cyanide sources, often in the presence of copper catalysts. Acetyl cyanide is also synthesized at 350 °C from ketene and hydrogen cyanide.

References

Further reading
 Lide, David R., W. M. Haynes, and Thomas J. Bruno, eds. CRC Handbook of Chemistry and Physics. 93rd ed. Boca Raton, FL: CRC, 2012. Web. 17 October 2012.
 

Acyl cyanides
Nitriles